Hasbrouck has multiple meanings:

People
Hasbrouck, as a surname, may refer to:

Abraham Bruyn Hasbrouck (1791-1879), U.S. Congressman from New York and president of Rutgers College
Abraham J. Hasbrouck (1773-1845), U.S. Congressman from New York
Josiah Hasbrouck (1755-1821), U.S. Representative from New York
Kenny Hasbrouck (born 1986), American basketball player
Louis Hasbrouck (1777–1834), New York politician
Lydia Sayer Hasbrouck (1827–1910), American suffragist and women's dress reformer
Sol Hasbrouck (1833–1906), American politician; mayor of Boise, Idaho
William C. Hasbrouck (1800-1870), American lawyer and politician

Places
Hasbrouck Heights, New Jersey
Hasbrouck House (disambiguation), the name of several historic houses